Tobias Matthay's Piano Quartet in One Movement in C major, Op. 20 is a composition for piano, violin, viola and cello that was completed in 1882, but not published until 1906 following revision in 1905, with a dedication to fellow composer John Blackwood McEwen.

Structure

The quartet comprises a single multi-tempo movement marked Maestoso - Allegro - Grandioso - Tempo I - Animato

External links

Chamber music by Tobias Matthay
Matthay
1882 compositions
Compositions in C major